Dale Swenson (born March 2, 1957) is a Democratic former member of the Kansas House of Representatives from the 97th district in Wichita, Kansas, Kansas.  From 1995 to 2008, he served as a Republican lawmaker; in 2009, he began a single two-year term as a Democrat. He was unseated on November 2, 2010, by the Democrat-turned-Republican Leslie Osterman, a retired health systems analyst from Wichita.

In 2012, Swenson lost a rematch with Osterman. He received 2,899 votes (41.6 percent) to Osterman's 4,068 votes (58.4 percent).

Committee membership
 Federal and State Affairs
 Financial Institutions
 Joint Committee on Arts and Cultural Resources
 Joint Committee on Pensions, Investments and Benefits
 Insurance

Major donors
The top 5 donors to Swenson's 2008 campaign:
1. Kansas National Education Assoc 	$1,000 	
2. Kansas Contractors Assoc 	$1,000
3. Service Employees International Union Missouri Council 	$1,000
4. Kansas Trial Lawyers Assoc 	$1,000 	
5. Kansans for Lifesaving Cures 	$750

Personal life
Swenson is married with two children. He was a painter at Boeing prior to being laid off when the company closed their Wichita plant.

On February 18, 2006, Swenson was arrested for driving under the influence. Following the arrest, Swenson stopped drinking.

See also
 List of American politicians who switched parties in office

References

External links
 Kansas Legislature - Dale Swenson
 Project Vote Smart profile
 Kansas Votes profile
 Campaign contributions: 1998, 2002,  2006, 2008

Members of the Kansas House of Representatives
Living people
Kansas Democrats
Kansas Republicans
Politicians from Wichita, Kansas
1957 births
20th-century American politicians
21st-century American politicians